The Baton Rouge Pro Tennis Classic was a professional tennis tournament played on outdoor hard courts. It was latterly part of the ATP Challenger Series and ATP Challenger Tour. It was held annually at the Lamar Tennis Center in Baton Rouge, Louisiana, United States, as a Futures from 2006 to 2007 and a Challenger from 2008 until 2010.

Past finals

Singles

Doubles

References

External links
Official website
ITF search

ATP Challenger Tour
Hard court tennis tournaments in the United States
Sports competitions in Baton Rouge, Louisiana
Tennis in Baton Rouge, Louisiana